Table tennis competitions at the 2007 Pan American Games in Rio de Janeiro were held in July 2007 at the Riocentro Sports Complex .

Singles

Team

See also
 List of Pan American Games medalists in table tennis

References

Pan American Games
Events at the 2007 Pan American Games
2007